The Flakpanzer 38(t), officially named Flakpanzer 38(t) auf Selbstfahrlafette 38(t) Ausf M (Sd.Kfz. 140), was a German self-propelled anti-aircraft gun used in World War II. It is sometimes incorrectly referred to as the Gepard, which may lead to confusion with the unrelated Flakpanzer Gepard.

Design and development
The Flakpanzer 38(t) was designed around the chassis of the LT-38, a pre-war Czech design, which following the German occupation was produced for the Wehrmacht as the Panzer 38(t) until it was no longer effective.

As the vehicle used the Ausf M chassis, the engine was located near the middle of the vehicle, and the armament was placed at the rear in a specially designed armoured section. The superstructure could fold down to allow 360-degree traverse at low elevation.

Including the single prototype, 141 Flakpanzer 38(t)s were built from November 1943 to February 1944, entering service in 1944.

Combat use

The Flakpanzer 38(t) was intended to be issued to the anti-aircraft platoon of each tank battalion (Panzer Abteilung) in a Panzer division.

Most of the Flakpanzer 38(t)s were issued to Panzer Divisions on the Western Front, the remainder served on the Eastern Front. An example user being the 12th SS Panzer Division.

At this late stage in the war, the single 2 cm FlaK main armament was no longer sufficient to ward off enemy aircraft, and the Flakpanzer 38(t) became easy prey for Allied fighter-bombers.

As its folding superstructure allowed a very low (-5°) elevation the Flakpanzer 38(t) was often used against enemy infantry and unarmoured or lightly armoured vehicles.

Survivors
Four complete vehicles exist, having been recovered from a French scrapyard in Trun, Normandy. They went to the following museums.

 Bayeux memorial
 Musee Automobiles de Normandie, Cleres (Now believed to be in private hands in the UK)
 Saumur armour museum
 Becker private collection

See also
 Sd.Kfz. 138/1 Grille - German self-propelled gun on similar chassis
 Panzer 38(t) - the chassis the Flakpanzer 38(t) was based on

References

Bibliography
 
 Ledwoch, J. (Shackleton, M. J. edited). Armour in Focus: Flakpanzer 38 (t)

External links

World War II self-propelled anti-aircraft weapons of Germany
Military vehicles introduced from 1940 to 1944